The Space Race was a competition between the United States and the Soviet Union to explore outer space.

Space race, Space Racer, and their derivations may also refer to:

Competitions and rivalries
Billionaire space race, the intense rivalry between billionaire entrants into NewSpace
Mars race, the competitive environment between various national space agencies, "New Space" and aerospace manufacturers involving crewed missions to Mars, land on Mars, or set a crewed base there
Space competition, an offer of a prize for the first competitor who demonstrates a space vehicle

Arts, entertainment, and media

Games
Space Race (video game), a 1973 arcade game by Atari
Looney Tunes: Space Race, a 2000 video game featuring the Looney Tunes
The Great Space Race, a 1984 computer game by Legend Software

Music
Space Race (album), a 1980 album by New Zealand rock band Mi-Sex
"Space Race" (Mi-Sex song), the titular song by Mi-Sex on their eponymous 1980 album 
"Space Race" (Billy Preston song) (instrumental), a song by Billy Preston

Television
Series
Space Race (TV series), a BBC docu-drama series first shown  on BBC2
 Space Racers, a 2014 animated children's TV showYogi's Space Race, a 1978 animated series by Hanna-Barbera Productions
Episodes
"Space Race" (Archer), the two-part third season finale of Archer"Space Race" (Stargate SG-1), an episode of the show Stargate SG-1"Space Race" (Steven Universe), a 2014 season 1 episode of Steven Universe''

See also
 List of space races
 
 
 
 Race (disambiguation)
 Space (disambiguation)
 The Race for Space (disambiguation)